Kardiva Channel (Dv: Kaashidhu Kandu) is a broad channel running from southwest to northeast and cutting across the Maldive atoll chain. This channel divides the Northern from the Central atolls of the Maldives.

This channel was important for ancient mariners plying along the spice route trying to bypass the long and dangerous shallow reefs of the Maldives without harm.

In the British Admiralty charts it is called Kardiva Channel. It appeared on the old French maps as Courant de Caridou. Locally it is also referred to as the northern part being the Kaashidhoo Bodu Kandu and Kaashidhoo Kuda Kandu the southern part.

Kardiva is the ancient Sanskritised name of Kaashidhu Island. This island lies towards the eastern end of this channel and gives its name to it. ("Kardiva Channel"). Kaashidhu Island is surrounded by deep waters and there is generally heavy surf all around. It has an oval-shaped lagoon (vilu) with a narrow fringing reef on its NW side.

See also
Kaashidhoo Bodu Kandu
Kaashidhoo Kuda Kandu

References
 Divehiraajjege Jōgrafīge Vanavaru. Muhammadu Ibrahim Lutfee. G.Sōsanī.
 Xavier Romero-Frias, The Maldive Islanders, A Study of the Popular Culture of an Ancient Ocean Kingdom. 1999,  

Channels of the Maldives
Channels of the Indian Ocean